Craig Barry (born 30 April 1992) is a South African rugby union player for the  in the Pro14. His regular position is fullback and wing.

References

South African rugby union players
Living people
1992 births
Rugby union players from Cape Town
Rugby union wings
Rugby union fullbacks
Cheetahs (rugby union) players
Stormers players
Western Province (rugby union) players
Free State Cheetahs players